Marcus Trick (born 5 January 1977) is a former German international rugby union player, playing for the SC Neuenheim in the Rugby-Bundesliga and the German national rugby union team.

Biography
Marcus Trick, born in Rottweil, started playing rugby when he was 17 years old in 1994, joining local club RC Rottweil. In 1999 he and his younger brother Armon Trick signed with SC Neuenheim. Since then he played for the SC Neuenheim, except when he spent four months with the Spanish club RC L´Hospitalet in 2004.

He earned his first cap for Germany in 2000 against the Ukraine and played 20 times for Germany since then. His greatest success as a national team player was the promotion to Division 1 of the European Nations Cup in 2008. He was finally capped for Germany in 2010 against Romania.

On domestic level, he won two German championships with his club team in 2003 and 2004 and made losing appearances in the 2001 finals against DRC Hannover and again in 2006 against RG Heidelberg and 2013 against Heidelberger RK.

At the end of the 2011-12 season it has been speculated that he and his brother would both end their career. Despite those rumors Marcus was still a member of the SCN squad in season 2012/2013 and regularly lined up in the Bundesliga. The lost championship final in 2013 turned out to be his last appearance in the Bundesliga as he announced his resignation during the 2013/2014 preseason.

Honours

Club
 German rugby union championship
 Winner: 2003, 2004
 Runners up: 2001, 2006, 2013
 German rugby union cup
 Winner: 1999, 2001
 Runners up: 2002, 2010

National team
 European Nations Cup - Division 2
 Champions: 2008

Stats
Marcus Trick's personal statistics in club and international rugby:

Club

 As of 10 April 2015

National team

European Nations Cup

Friendlies & other competitions

 As of 25 February 2010

References

External links
  Marcus Trick profile at totalrugby.de

1977 births
Living people
People from Rottweil (district)
Sportspeople from Freiburg (region)
Rugby union props
German rugby union players
Germany international rugby union players
SC Neuenheim players